A binary expression tree is a specific kind of a binary tree used to represent expressions. Two common types of expressions that a binary expression tree can represent are algebraic and boolean.  These trees can represent expressions that contain both unary and binary operators.

Like any binary tree, each node of a binary expression tree has zero, one, or two children. This restricted structure simplifies the processing of expression trees.

Overview 

The leaves of a binary expression tree are operands, such as constants or variable names, and the other nodes contain operators. These particular trees happen to be binary, because all of the operations are binary, and although this is the simplest case, it is possible for nodes to have more than two children. It is also possible for a node to have only one child, as is the case with the unary minus operator. An expression tree, T, can be evaluated by applying the operator at the root to the values obtained by recursively evaluating the left and right subtrees.

Traversal 
An algebraic expression can be produced from a binary expression tree by recursively producing a parenthesized left expression, then printing out the operator at the root, and finally recursively producing a parenthesized right expression. This general strategy (left, node, right) is known as an in-order traversal.
An alternate traversal strategy is to recursively print out the left subtree, the right subtree, and then the operator. This traversal strategy is generally known as post-order traversal. A third strategy is to print out the operator first and then recursively print out the left and right subtree known as pre-order traversal.

These three standard depth-first traversals are representations of the three different expression formats: infix, postfix, and prefix. An infix expression is produced by the inorder traversal, a postfix expression is produced by the post-order traversal, and a prefix expression is produced by the pre-order traversal.

Infix traversal
When an infix expression is printed, an opening and closing parenthesis must be added at the beginning and ending of each expression. As every subtree represents a subexpression, an opening parenthesis is printed at its start and the closing parenthesis is printed after processing all of its children.

Pseudocode:

Algorithm infix (tree)
/*Print the infix expression for an expression tree.
 Pre : tree is a pointer to an expression tree
 Post: the infix expression has been printed*/
 if (tree not empty)
    if (tree token is operator)
       print (open parenthesis)
    end if
    infix (tree left subtree)
    print (tree token)
    infix (tree right subtree)
    if (tree token is operator)
       print (close parenthesis)
    end if
 end if
end infix

Postfix traversal
The postfix expression is formed by the basic postorder traversal of any binary tree. It does not require parentheses.

Pseudocode:

Algorithm postfix (tree)
/*Print the postfix expression for an expression tree.
 Pre : tree is a pointer to an expression tree
 Post: the postfix expression has been printed*/
 if (tree not empty)
    postfix (tree left subtree)
    postfix (tree right subtree)
    print (tree token)
 end if
end postfix

Prefix traversal
Pseudocode:

Algorithm prefix (tree)
/*Print the prefix expression for an expression tree.
 Pre : tree is a pointer to an expression tree
 Post: the prefix expression has been printed*/
 if (tree not empty)
    print (tree token)
    prefix (tree left subtree)
    prefix (tree right subtree)
 end if
end prefix

Construction of an expression tree 
The construction of the tree takes place by reading the postfix expression one symbol at a time. If the symbol is an operand, a one-node tree is created and its pointer is pushed onto a stack. If the symbol is an operator, the pointers to two trees T1 and T2 are popped from the stack and a new tree whose root is the operator and whose left and right children point to T2 and T1 respectively is formed . A pointer to this new tree is then pushed to the Stack.

Example 
The input in postfix notation is: a b + c d e + * *
Since the first two symbols are operands, one-node trees are created and pointers  to them are pushed onto a stack. For convenience the stack will grow from left to right.

The next symbol is a '+'. It pops the two pointers to the trees, a new tree is formed, and a pointer to it is pushed onto the stack.

Next, c, d, and e are read. A one-node tree is created for each and a pointer to the corresponding tree is pushed onto the stack.

Continuing, a '+' is read, and it merges the last two trees.

Now, a '*' is read. The last two tree pointers are popped and a new tree is formed with a '*' as the root.

Finally, the last symbol is read. The two trees are merged and a pointer to the final tree remains on the stack.

Algebraic expressions 
 
Algebraic expression trees represent expressions that contain numbers, variables, and unary and binary operators. Some of the common operators are × (multiplication), ÷ (division), + (addition), − (subtraction), ^ (exponentiation), and - (negation). The operators are contained in the internal nodes of the tree, with the numbers and variables in the leaf nodes. The nodes of binary operators have two child nodes, and the unary operators have one child node.

Boolean expressions 
 
Boolean expressions are represented very similarly to algebraic expressions, the only difference being the specific values and operators used. Boolean expressions use true and false as constant values, and the operators include  (AND),  (OR),  (NOT).

See also 
Expression (mathematics)
Term (logic)
Context-free grammar
Parse tree
Abstract syntax tree

References 

Binary trees
Computer algebra